Thalassotalea ganghwensis  is a Gram-negative, aerobic and halophilic bacterium from the genus of Thalassotalea which has been isolated from tidal flat sediments in Korea.

References

 

Alteromonadales
Bacteria described in 2014